Poitier is a surname.  Notable people with the name include:

 Damion Poitier (born 1976), American actor
 Jane Poitier (1736–1786), British singer and dancer
 Sidney Poitier (1927–2022), Bahamian-American actor, film director, and author
 Sydney Tamiia Poitier (born 1973), American TV actress and daughter of Sidney Poitier

See also
 Poitiers (disambiguation)